Boonville Airport  is a city-owned, public-use airport located two nautical miles (2.3 mi, 3.7 km) west of the central business district of Boonville, a city in Warrick County, Indiana, United States.

Facilities and aircraft 
It has one runway designated 9/27 with a turf surface measuring 2,300 by 100 feet (701 x 30 m).

For the 12-month period ending December 31, 2007, the airport had 5,688 general aviation aircraft operations, an average of 15 per day. At that time there were 15 single-engine aircraft based at this airport.

References

External links 
 Aerial photo from INDOT Airport Directory
 Aerial photo as of 12 April 1998 from USGS The National Map
 

Airports in Indiana
Buildings and structures in Warrick County, Indiana
Transportation in Warrick County, Indiana